Stalingrad (Russian: Сталинград) is a 1990 two-part war film written and directed by Yuri Ozerov, and produced by Quincy Jones and Clarence Avant. Revolving around the eponymous Battle of Stalingrad, the film was a co-production between the Soviet Union and East Germany. It stars an ensemble cast featuring Powers Boothe, Mikhail Ulyanov, Bruno Freindlich, Fernando Allende, Sergei Garmash, Nikolai Kryuchkov, and Ronald Lacey.

Plot

Film I
In January 1942, Adolf Hitler appoints Fedor von Bock to command Army Group South and supervise Operation Blau. The German forces advance in the south of Russia, scattering the Soviets and approaching Stalingrad, that seems on the verge of falling to the enemy's hands. The movie ends with Vasily Chuikov assuming command of the 62nd Army at September.

Film II
The Germans attack Stalingrad, and are engaged in close-quarters combat within the city. Chuikov's soldiers manage to hold on to their positions; On 19 November 1942, the Red Army launches a successful counter-offensive and encircles the Wehrmacht formations. In February 1943, the German 6th Army surrenders to the Soviets.

Production
The film was a sequel to Ozerov's 1985 Battle of Moscow, with its plot starting directly in the beginning of the former, after von Bock failed to capture Moscow. In general, Stalingrad was Ozerov's fourth work dealing with the Soviet-German War, after the 1970–71 series Liberation, the 1977 TV mini-series Soldiers of Freedom and Battle of Moscow.

Due to the harsh economic conditions in the late 1980s Soviet Union, Ozerov was unable to secure funding for his film inside the USSR. After deliberations, he approached the American Warner Brothers for assistance. The company agreed to provide financial support, but demanded that American actors would be given representation. The reluctant director had to cast Powers Boothe for the title role of General Vasily Chuikov. The film was the first Soviet-American co-production in the Perestroika era.

Reception
The film was poorly received, and it was Ozerov's first work which failed to secure any nominations since 1958. In 1993, the director used footage from Stalingrad for the frame story of his last film, Angels of Death, about a sniper duel taking place during the battle for the city. Montage from Stalingrad was also included in two TV anthologies of select material from Ozerov's films, The Tragedy of the Twentieth Century and The Great Captain Georgy Zhukov.

Cast

Soviet Union 

Powers Boothe as General Vasily Chuikov
Mikhail Ulyanov as Marshal Georgy Zhukov
Bruno Freindlich as Marshal Boris Shaposhnikov
Fernando Allende as Lieutenant Rubén Ruiz Ibárruri
Sergei Garmash as Sergeant Yakov Pavlov
Liubomiras Laucevičius as General Kuzma Gurov
Boris Nevzorov as General Nikolai Krylov
 Vadim Lobanov as Nikita Khrushchev
Andrey Smolyakov as Lieutenant Leonid Khrushchev
Archil Gomiashvili as Joseph Stalin
Vladimir Troshin as Kliment Voroshilov
 Nikolai Zasukhin as Vyacheslav Molotov
 Stepan Mikoyan as Anastas Mikoyan
 Viktor Uralsky as Mikhail Kalinin
Nikolai Kryuchkov as old captain
Fyodor Bondarchuk as sniper Ivan
 Nikolai Simkin as Alexander Poskrebyshev
 Vyacheslav Ezepov as Alexander Shcherbakov
 Valeri Tzvetkov as General Andrey Yeryomenko
 Vitali Rastalnoi as Marshal Semyon Timoshenko
 Evgeni Burenkov as General Aleksandr Vasilevsky
 Aleksandr Goloborodko as General Konstantin Rokossovsky
Sergei Nikonenko as General Alexander Rodimtsev
Oksana Fandera as Natasha

Germany 

Horst Schulze as Erich Edgar Schulze
Gerd Michael Henneberg as Field Marshal Wilhelm Keitel
Günter Junghans as Harro Schulze-Boysen
 Achim Petri as Adolf Hitler
 Erich Thiede as Heinrich Himmler
 Ernst Heise as Field Marshal Fedor von Bock
Boris Levkovich as Colonel Hermann

Ronald Lacey makes an appearance as Winston Churchill.

References

External links
 

1990 films
Soviet war films
East German films
Mosfilm films
1990s Russian-language films
Films directed by Yuri Ozerov
Soviet Union–United States relations
Films about the Battle of Stalingrad
Czech war films
Cultural depictions of Adolf Hitler
Cultural depictions of Winston Churchill
Cultural depictions of Joseph Stalin
Cultural depictions of Nikita Khrushchev
Cultural depictions of Heinrich Himmler
Cultural depictions of Georgy Zhukov
Films produced by Quincy Jones
Czech World War II films
Soviet World War II films
German World War II films
American World War II films
Czechoslovak World War II films
Russian World War II films
World War II films based on actual events
1990s American films
1990s German films
Soviet epic films